Jawahar Navodaya Vidyalaya, Middle Andaman or locally known as JNV Panchawati is a boarding, co-educational  school in North and Middle Andaman district of Andaman and Nicobar Islands, a U.T. in India. JNV Panchawati is funded by the Indian Ministry of Human Resources Development and administered  by Navodaya Vidyalaya Smiti, an autonomous body under the ministry. Navodaya Vidyalayas offer free education to talented children, from Class VI to XII.

History 
This school was established in 1987, and is a part of Jawahar Navodaya Vidyalaya schools. Initially school was located in temporary premises at Bloomsdale, Chauldhari, south Andaman. In 1996-1997 the school was shifted to permanent campus at Panchawati Village, Rangat taluk, Middle Andaman. This school is administered and monitored by Hyderabad regional office of Navodaya Vidyalaya Smiti.

Admission 
Admission to JNV Middle Andaman at class VI level is made through nationwide selection test conducted by Navodaya Vidyalaya Smiti. The information about test is disseminated and advertised in district by the office of North and Middle Andaman district magistrate (Collector), who is also the chairperson of school Vidyalya Management Committee (VMC).

Affiliations 
JNV Middle Andaman is affiliated to Central Board of Secondary Education with affiliation number 2540002.

See also 
 Jawahar Navodaya Vidyalaya, Car Nicobar
 Jawahar Navodaya Vidyalaya, South Andaman
 List of JNV schools

References

External links 

 Official Website of JNV Middle Andaman

Middle Andaman
Educational institutions established in 1987
1987 establishments in the Andaman and Nicobar Islands
North and Middle Andaman district